Hollerich railway station is a railway station serving Hollerich, a quarter in the south-west of Luxembourg City, in southern Luxembourg.  It is operated by Chemins de Fer Luxembourgeois, the state-owned railway company.

The station is situated on Line 70, which connects Luxembourg City to the south-west of the country.  It is the first stop south-west of the country's main terminus, Luxembourg railway station, which is located only  to the north-east.

Located at the station is the Luxembourg memorial to the deportations during the German occupation of Luxembourg in World War II. Just under 700 Jews were deported from Luxembourg.

External links
 Official CFL page on Hollerich station
 Rail.lu page on Hollerich station

Railway stations in Luxembourg City
Railway stations on CFL Line 70